The 1950 DEI Championship season was the 32nd season and also the last edition of the Dutch East Indies Championship football competition since its establishment in 1914. Soerabaja are the defending champions, having won their 11th league title.

This is the second edition the league organised by V.U.V.S.I./I.S.N.I.S., It was contested by 7 teams, and Soerabaja won the championship.

League table

Result

Voortoernooi in Surabaja
All matches play in Surabaja.

Voortoernooi in Djakarta
All matches play in Djakarta.

Voorwedstrĳden Makassar

Eindtoernooi
All matches play in Bandung.

References

External links
N.I.V.B./N.I.V.U./V.U.V.S.I. Stedenwedstrĳden

Indo
Indo
1950 in Indonesian sport